Vigor Bovolenta (30 May 1974 – 24 March 2012) was a volleyball player from Italy. Bovolenta was part of the men's national team that won the European Championship in 1995 and the silver medal at the 1996 Summer Olympics.

He died at the age of 37 only a few hours after feeling faint (allegedly suffering a heart attack) during an Italian League fourth level game between his team, Forlì, and the reserve team of Macerata. He had severe coronary artery disease similar to Sergey Grinkov.

See also
List of sportspeople who died during their careers

References

External links
RAI Profile

1974 births
2012 deaths
Italian men's volleyball players
Olympic volleyball players of Italy
Olympic silver medalists for Italy
Volleyball players at the 1996 Summer Olympics
Volleyball players at the 2008 Summer Olympics
Olympic medalists in volleyball
Medalists at the 1996 Summer Olympics